Living Is Easy with Eyes Closed is a 2013 Spanish comedy-drama film written and directed by David Trueba, and starring Javier Cámara, Natalia de Molina, and Francesc Colomer. The film's title comes from a lyric in the song "Strawberry Fields Forever", from the Beatles. 

The film won six Goya Awards, including Film, Director, Original Screenplay, and Actor. It was selected as the Spanish entry for the Best Foreign Language Film at the 87th Academy Awards, but was not nominated.

Plot
It is 1966 in Albacete, an English teacher and die-hard Beatles fan Antonio decides to go on a road trip to Almería in the hope of meeting John Lennon, who is shooting How I Won the War there under the direction of Richard Lester. On the way he picks up two hitch-hikers, Juanjo and Belén, and the unlikely trio follow their dreams and look for their own freedom.

Cast

Reception
Living Is Easy with Eyes Closed received positive reviews from film critics.

Stephen Farber of The Hollywood Reporter wrote that the film "offers a lovely evocation of Spain as well as a touching tribute to an unforgettable moment in time when the Beatles seemed to offer brand new possibilities". Dennis Harvey of Variety deemed the film to be a "leisurely, pleasing seriocomedy" about a middle-aged Beatles fanatic's quest in 1966 Spain. Javier Cortijo of Cinemanía rated the film 3½ out of 5 stars, underscoring as a veredict that "despite the thick accents, everything sounds crystal clear and the songs talk about us".

Accolades 

|-
| align = "center" rowspan = "13" | 2014 
| rowspan=6 | 
| colspan=2 | Best Comedy Film
| 
| rowspan = "6" | 
|-
| Best Director
| David Trueba
| 
|-
| Best Screenplay
| David Trueba
| 
|-
| Best Main Actor
| Javier Cámara
| 
|-
| Best Supporting Actress
| Natalia de Molina
| 
|-
| Best Original Soundtrack
| Pat Metheny
| 
|-
| rowspan=7 | 
| colspan=2 | Best Film
| 
| rowspan = "7" | 
|-
| Best Director
| David Trueba
| 
|-
| Best Actor
| Javier Cámara
| 
|-
| Best New Actress
| Natalia de Molina
| 
|-
| Best Original Screenplay
| David Trueba
| 
|-
| Best Original Score
| Pat Metheny
| 
|-
| Best Costume Design
| Lala Huete
| 
|}

See also
 List of Spanish films of 2013
 List of submissions to the 87th Academy Awards for Best Foreign Language Film
 List of Spanish submissions for the Academy Award for Best Foreign Language Film

References

External links
 
 
 

2013 films
Spanish comedy-drama films
Films set in 1966
2010s Spanish-language films
The Beatles in film
Films shot in Almería
2010s Spanish films
Films set in Spain